There are several scientific or humanitarian prizes and awards named after Albert Einstein:

 Albert Einstein Award, (Lewis and Rosa Strauss Memorial Fund), first awarded in 1951
 Albert Einstein Medal, (Albert Einstein Society, Bern), first awarded in 1979
 UNESCO Albert Einstein medal (UNESCO), first awarded in 1979
 Albert Einstein Peace Prize (Albert Einstein Peace Prize Foundation), first awarded in 1980
 Albert Einstein World Award of Science, (World Cultural Council), first awarded in 1984
 Einstein Prize for Laser Science, (Society for Optical and Quantum Electronics), awarded in the 1988–1996 period
 Einstein Prize (APS), (American Physical Society), first awarded in 2003
 , first awarded in 2021